The 1966 Long Beach State 49ers football team represented California State College, Long Beach—now known as California State University, Long Beach—as a member of the California Collegiate Athletic Association (CCAA) during the 1966 NCAA College Division football season. Led by ninth-year head coach Don Reed, the 49ers compiled an overall record of 6–3 with a mark of 3–2 in conference play, tying for second place in the CCAA. The team played home games at Veterans Memorial Stadium adjacent to the campus of Long Beach City College in Long Beach, California.

Schedule

Team members in the NFL
The following player was selected in the 1967 NFL Draft.

Notes

References

Long Beach State
Long Beach State 49ers football seasons
Long Beach State 49ers football